Bojan Westin (5 September 1926 – 4 October 2013) was a Swedish actress. She appeared in more than 30 films and television shows between 1941 and 2011.

Selected filmography
 The Talk of the Town (1941)
 The Ghost Reporter (1941)
 Tired Theodore (1945)
  Kristin Commands (1946)
 Jens Mansson in America (1947)
 Underground Secrets (1991)
 Drowning Ghost (2004)
 Sökarna: Återkomsten (2006)

References

External links

1926 births
2013 deaths
20th-century Swedish actresses
21st-century Swedish actresses
Swedish film actresses
Swedish television actresses
People from Gävleborg County